Abdrashbash (Äbdräşbaş) is a rural locality (a village) in Azyakovsky Selsoviet of Burayevsky District, Bashkortostan, Russia. Its population is 88 as of 2010.

Geography 
Abdrashbash is located 16 km south of Burayevo (the district's administrative centre) by road. Mullino is the nearest rural locality.

Ethnicity 
The village is inhabited by Tatars and others.

References 

Rural localities in Burayevsky District